Notable people with the given name Diego include:

Diego (footballer), a variety of association football players
Diego de Oviedo, 10th-century Asturian prelate
Diego de León, 12th-century Leonese prelate
Diego de Ourense, 12th-century Galician prelate
Diego de Asturias, 16th-century Spanish Royal heir who died at age 7
Diego Abatantuono, Italian actor and screenwriter
Diego de Almagro, Spanish conquistador
Diego Aventín, Argentine race car driver
Diego Buñuel, French journalist
Diego Camacho (tennis), Bolivian tennis player
Diego Castillo (disambiguation), several people
Diego Colón, 4th viceroy of New Spain
Diego Corrales, American boxer
Diego D'Ambrosio, Italian-American businessman
Diego Deza, Spanish theologian and inquisitor
Diego Domínguez (disambiguation), several people
Diego Durán, Spanish Dominican friar
Diego El Mulato, a name given to several pirates who were active in the Caribbean in the 1600s
Diego Fabbrini, Italian footballer
Diego Fuser, Italian footballer
Diego Gelmírez, first archbishop of Compostela
Diego González, Mexican singer, musician and actor, often known simply as Diego (also known as Diego Boneta in the U.S.)
Diego García de Moguer, Spanish-Portuguese explorer
Diego Hartfield, Argentine tennis player
Diego Hypólito, Brazilian gymnast
Diego José de Cádiz (1743–1801), Spanish Capuchin friar
Diego de Landa, 16th-century bishop of Yucatán
Diego Klattenhoff, Canadian actor
Diego Luna, Mexican actor
Diego Maradona, Argentine football player
Diego Masson, French music conductor and composer
Diego de Mendoza, Mexican city king in the 16th century
Diego Morales (disambiguation), several people
Diego Nargiso, Italian tennis player
Diego Pérez, Uruguayan tennis player
Diego Portales, Chilean politician
Diego Rivera, Mexican painter
Diego Rodríguez (son of El Cid), Spanish soldier
Diego Sanchez, American mixed martial artist
Diego Schwartzman, Argentine tennis player
Diego Seguí, Cuban baseball pitcher
Diego Silang, Philippine revolutionary leader
Diego Siloe, Spanish Renaissance architect and sculptor
Diego Torres, Argentine singer and composer
Diego Vargas (disambiguation), several people
Diego de Vargas, Spanish governor of New Spain
Diego Villanueva, Brazilian singer-songwriter
Diego Velázquez, 17th-century Spanish painter
Diego Velázquez de Cuéllar, Spanish conquistador

Fictional characters 
 Diego, a saber-tooth tiger voiced by Denis Leary of the film series Ice Age
 Diego Alcazar, in the TV series General Hospital
 Diego Armando, the defence attorney from Phoenix Wright: Ace Attorney − Trials and Tribulations, who is mostly seen under the name Godot (who becomes a prosecutor)
 Diego Brando, from the seventh part of the manga JoJo's Bizarre Adventure, Steel Ball Run
 Don Diego de la Vega, the real identity of Zorro
 Diego Márquez, cousin of Dora the Explorer with his own spinoff TV show Go, Diego, Go!
 Diego Torres, in the Netflix series 13 Reasons Why
 Diego Hargreeves, main character in the comic book/Netflix series The Umbrella Academy

D
D
Diego